Simmons Stone House is a historic home located at Colonie in Albany County, New York.  It was built between 1847 and 1849 and is a two-story, massive cruciform plan stone house constructed of random ashlar blocks.  It has an intersecting, low pitched gable roof with broad overhanging cornice in the Italianate style.  It features a one-story porch across the front elevation with a cobblestone foundation and hipped roof supported by square columns.

It was listed on the National Register of Historic Places in 1985.

References

Houses on the National Register of Historic Places in New York (state)
Italianate architecture in New York (state)
Houses completed in 1849
Houses in Albany County, New York
1849 establishments in New York (state)
National Register of Historic Places in Albany County, New York